City of Chance is a 1940 American crime drama film directed by Ricardo Cortez and written by John Larkin and Barry Trivers. The film stars Lynn Bari, C. Aubrey Smith, Donald Woods and Amanda Duff. The film was released on January 13, 1940, by 20th Century Fox. The executive producer for the film was Sol M. Wurtzel.

Plot
Steve Walker (Woods), is a gambler on the high society New York City scene, who owns an illegal gambling house. A young Texan woman, Julie (Lynn Bari), arrives in New York and enters the casino and she immediately takes a shining to him. Steve soon finds out that they were childhood sweethearts when she was a small girl known as "Pugnose" in Boonville, Texas. Despite the charm of the woman, Steve and The Judge (Aubrey Smith) immediately notice that she is intelligent and become suspicious of her intentions. Overhearing that a couple are due to be married but want to keep it a secret, Julie, who is a newspaper reporter, tries to contact her newspaper editor and inform them of the marriage, but Steve directs her call to his office and pretends to be the editor.

Julie overhears the woman due to be married (Lois) being threatened by Baron Joseph (D'Arcy). Julie intrudes and encounters Lois in Steve's office where Steve and The Judge confront Lynn and tell her that they know she's a reporter who has been sent to help shut his place down. The Judge informs Walker that he thinks Lynn is in love with him and the two amuse themselves by keeping her away from the telephone, which Julie becomes wise to.

Later on, Julie overhears a woman saying that she will interfere with a game with loaded dice and set up Steve. She tries to warn Steve, who playfully pushes her away, though Julie interferes at the start of the game and reveals the dice the Steve. In Steve's office, Julie is overpowered by an intruder (Charlie) and sets off an alarm which leads to Steve and The Judge resorting to trickery to enter the office and confront Charlie. The Judge rings Lois and tells her that everything will be fine with the Baron. Lynn tells The Judge that she wants Steve to quit at the casino due to the constant danger he is in, and to return to Texas to live with her. Finally, Julie gets through to her editor to tip him off shortly before a raid by the police. Fortunately Steve had just sold the casino to rival gangster Marty Connors (Lane) before the police raid, who is arrested. The Judge, making his fortune from the sale, enjoys a trip on the SS Queen.

Cast  
Lynn Bari as Julie Reynolds
C. Aubrey Smith as The Judge
Donald Woods as Steve Walker
Amanda Duff as Lois Carlyle Blane
June Gale as Molly
Richard Lane as Marty Connors
Robert Lowery as Ted Blaine
Alexander D'Arcy as Baron Joseph
George Douglas as Muscles
Harry Shannon as Passline
Eddie Marr as Charlie Nevins
Robert Allen as Fred Walcott
Charlotte Wynters as Mrs. Helen Walcott
Nora Lane as Mrs. Dorothy Grainger

References

External links 
 

1940 films
20th Century Fox films
American crime drama films
1940 drama films
American black-and-white films
Films scored by Samuel Kaylin
Films about gambling
Films set in New York City
1940s crime drama films
Films directed by Ricardo Cortez
1940s English-language films
1940s American films